This is a list of broadcast television stations that are licensed in the U.S. state of Indiana.

Full-power stations
VC refers to the station's PSIP virtual channel. RF refers to the station's physical RF channel.

Defunct full-power stations
Channel 31: WTAF-TV - Marion (11/3/1962–3/14/1969)
Channel 40: WURD - Ind. - Indianapolis (1/25/1971–6/25/1972)
Channel 49: WLBC-TV - ABC/CBS/NBC - Muncie (5/8/1953-1971)
Channel 50: WCAE - NET/PBS - St. John (9/26/1967–3/31/1983)
Channel 52: WRAY-TV - Princeton (12/6/1953–7/17/1954)

LPTV stations

Indiana

Television stations